Tapani may refer to:

 Tapani (name), a Finnish male given name
 Tapani (surname), a Finnish surname
 Tapani, Iran, a village in Kermanshah Province, Iran
 Tapani Incident, an armed uprising against Japanese rule in Taiwan

See also
 Tapan (disambiguation)